

Dinosaurs

Plesiosaurs

New taxa

Xiphosurans

Newly named xiphosurans

References